Andrzej Mateja (26 August 1935 – 5 March 2019) was a Polish cross-country skier. He competed at the 1956 Winter Olympics and the 1960 Winter Olympics. He died on 5 March 2019.

References

1935 births
2019 deaths
Polish male cross-country skiers
Olympic cross-country skiers of Poland
Cross-country skiers at the 1956 Winter Olympics
Cross-country skiers at the 1960 Winter Olympics
People from Tatra County